Nanohammus is a genus of longhorn beetles of the subfamily Lamiinae, containing the following species:

 Nanohammus aberrans (Gahan, 1894)
 Nanohammus alboplagiatus Breuning, 1944
 Nanohammus annulicornis (Pic, 1934)
 Nanohammus grangeri Breuning, 1962
 Nanohammus itzingeri (Breuning, 1935)
 Nanohammus myrrhatus (Pascoe, 1878)
 Nanohammus rondoni Breuning, 1963
 Nanohammus rufescens Bates, 1884
 Nanohammus sinicus (Pic, 1925)
 Nanohammus subfasciatus (Matsushita, 1941)
 Nanohammus taiyal Gressitt, 1951

References

Lamiini